Lindon Victor (born 28 February 1993) is a Grenadian athlete who competes in the decathlon.

Career
In 2016, he scored 8446 points with nine personal bests at the Southeastern Conference Championship decathlon, breaking both the SEC record and the Grenadian National Record , the latter of which was set by his brother, Kurt Felix, at the 2015 IAAF World Championships. Victor was named 2016 SEC Field Athlete of the Year.

Victor qualified for and represented Grenada at the 2016 Summer Olympics in Rio de Janeiro, Brazil, in the decathlon. He placed sixteenth with a score of 7998 points. Victor was the flag bearer for Grenada for the closing of the games. In that same year he was credited as having second best discus throw in decathlon history.

Lindon started his 2017 season with indoor events. He improved his personal best performances in the (indoor) 60 meter sprint, High Jump, Shot Put, Pole Vault and 1000 Meter run. He also set a personal best in the Heptathlon indoor with an overall score of 5976, this was 10 points shy of the national record held by Kurt Felix. On 29 March 2017, Lindon set the highest collegiate first day score in the decathlon with a total of 4,516 points in Texas Relays decathlon. On the next day Victor completed with a score of 8472. This was not only yet another National and OECS Record for Victor but it was also a new Collegiate Outdoor Decathlon Record, erasing the old mark of 8465 which was set by Trey Hardee in 2006.
On May 11–12 Lindon remarked on the defense of his SEC Champions Decathlon title and was not only successful in the defense but bettered the National Record in the Pole Vault. He was also able to improve on his Collegiate record with a new mark of 8539 points. He was subsequently named the SEC Men's Field athlete of the year for the second year in a row.

The end of 2017 found Lindon being among the final 3 nominees for that year's Bowerman Award which is an annual track and field award that is the highest accolade given to the year's best student-athlete in American collegiate track and field. He eventually lost out to American Sprinter Christian Coleman.

On January 5, 2018 at the National Sports Awards, Lindon was named 2017 sportsman of the year.

Victor was competing at his second major international meet since graduating from Texas A&M, where he set an all-time collegiate record with 8,539 points and was a two-time NCAA Division 1 decathlon champion - Victor won the decathlon to earn a gold medal for Grenada scoring 8,303 points. On April 30, during Texas A&M Athletics' fifth-annual Building Champions Awards gala held in the Hall of Champions at Kyle Field. Athlete of the Year honor(male) was awarded to Lindon.

Personal bests

Competition record

References

External links

All-athletics profile
Lindon Victor News

1993 births
Living people
Grenadian decathletes
Grenadian male javelin throwers
Grenadian male discus throwers
People from St. George's, Grenada
Olympic decathletes
Olympic athletes of Grenada
Athletes (track and field) at the 2016 Summer Olympics
Athletes (track and field) at the 2015 Pan American Games
Athletes (track and field) at the 2019 Pan American Games
Commonwealth Games gold medallists for Grenada
Commonwealth Games medallists in athletics
Athletes (track and field) at the 2018 Commonwealth Games
World Athletics Championships athletes for Grenada
Pan American Games silver medalists for Grenada
Pan American Games medalists in athletics (track and field)
Commonwealth Games gold medallists in athletics
Medalists at the 2019 Pan American Games
Athletes (track and field) at the 2020 Summer Olympics
Texas A&M Aggies men's track and field athletes
Medallists at the 2018 Commonwealth Games